, until October 1, 2015 , is a Japanese production company and distributor of films and series.

Works

CB Chara Go Nagai World (1990) 
Burn Up (1991) 
Giant Robo: The Day the Earth Stood Still (1992) 
GinRei Specials (1994-1995) 
Street Fighter II V (1996) 
Those Who Hunt Elves (1996) 
Night Warriors: Darkstalkers' Revenge (1997) 
Ninja Resurrection (1998) 
Getter Robo Armageddon (1998) 
Shin Getter Robo vs Neo Getter Robo (2000) 
Mazinkaiser (2001) 
Mazinkaiser vs. The Great General of Darkness (2003) 
New Getter Robo (2004) 
Burn Up Scramble (2004)  
Destiny of the Shrine Maiden (2004)  
Grenadier (2004)  
Ninja Nonsense (2004)  
Final Approach (2004) 
W Wish (2004)  
Embracing Love (2004) 
Uta Kata (2004) 
Elemental Gelade (2005) 
Moeyo Ken TV (2005) 
Eureka Seven (2005) 
Demon Prince Enma (2006) 
Shakugan no Shana II (2007-2008)
Gake no Ue no Ponyo (2008)
Hyakka Ryōran (2010)
Usagi Drop (2011)
Black Bullet (2014)
The Comic Artist and His Assistants (2014)
Daimidaler Prince vs. Penguin Empire (2014)
Is the Order a Rabbit? (2014)
Kamigami no Asobi (2014)
Selector Infected Wixoss (2014)
Suisei no Gargantia: Meguru Kōro, Haruka (2014)
Girls und Panzer der Film (2015)
World of Delight (2015)
Mars ~Tada, Kimi wo Aishiteru! (2016)
Ankoku Joshi (2017)
Maquia: When the Promised Flower Blooms (2018)

References

External links
 
 

Film distributors of Japan
Anime companies
International sales agents